Ireland participated in and won the Eurovision Song Contest 1970 with the song "All Kinds of Everything" performed by Dana. John Skehan was the spokesperson for Ireland in the Contest. Valerie McGovern commentated on RTÉ One, and Kevin Roche on RTÉ Radio 1.

Before Eurovision

National final
The Irish National final was held on Sunday 1 March, three weeks later than planned owing to a technicians' strike at the national broadcaster. It was broadcast live from the RTÉ studios in Dublin on RTÉ Television, and hosted by Brendan O'Reilly. Eight songs competed for the honour of representing Ireland at the Eurovision Song Contest 1970 being held in Amsterdam. The winning song was decided by 10 regional juries throughout Ireland.

Dana had previously participated in the Irish national final in 1969, and finished in second place. Both Anna McGoldrick and Tony Kenny had sung in the national contest in 1968.

At Eurovision

Voting 
Every country had a jury of ten people. Every jury member could give one point to his or her favourite song.

References

1970
Countries in the Eurovision Song Contest 1970
Eurovision
Eurovision